Sandila is an assembly constituency of the Uttar Pradesh Legislative Assembly covering the area of Sandila in Hardoi district of Uttar Pradesh, India.
Sandila is one of five assembly constituencies in the Misrikh Lok Sabha constituency. Since 2008, this assembly constituency is numbered 161 amongst 403 constituencies.
Currently this constituency is represented by Alka Singh Arkvanshi, who won in 2022 Uttar Pradesh Legislative Assembly election.

Election results

2022 Uttar Pradesh Legislative Assembly Elections 
Bharatiya Janata Party candidate Alka Singh Arkvanshi won in 2022 Uttar Pradesh Legislative Assembly election defeating Bahujan Samaj Party candidate Abdul Mannan by a margin of 37,103 votes.

2017 Uttar Pradesh Legislative Assembly Elections
Bharatiya Janata Party candidate Raj Kumar Agrawal won in 2017 Uttar Pradesh Legislative Elections defeating Samajwadi Party candidate Abdul Mannan by a margin of 20,403 votes.

References

External links
 

Assembly constituencies of Uttar Pradesh
Politics of Hardoi district